Artyom Valeryevich Tkachenko (born April 30, 1982) is a Russian film and theater actor.

Biography 
He engaged in the theater studio under the direction of Boris Beinenson. After school he entered the Mikhail Shchepkin Higher Theatre School. 
Between 2003 and 2005 he worked in the troupe . He played in such performances as Wandering Stars, Half of New York to Me Now Relatives and others.

In the film — since 2004.

Since September 2017 is the face of the television channel AXN Sci Fi in the territory of the CIS.

Personal life
 His first wife — Ravshana Kurkova, actress (2004-2008)
 Second wife — Eugenia Khrapovitskaya, model, aspiring actress (2012-2015)
 Son Tikhon (born January 23, 2013)
 Since 2015 he lives with Ekaterina Steblinа. Son Stepan (born November 7, 2016).

Filmography 
2004 —   Don't Even Think! Independence Play as Bely
2005 —  Dream On as Shnek
2006 —  Filipp's Bay as Kostya
2006 —  Insatiable as Riga
 2006 —  The Sword Bearer as Sasha / Swordsman
 2007 —  The Russian Triangle as Kolya Vorontsov
2007 —  Waiting for a Мiracle as a passerby
2007 —  Don Juan's Confession as Monk
2007 — Relatives and Friends as Kirill
2008 — Indigo as Pavel Maksimovich Soshin
 2008 — Little Moscow    as Sayat
 2009 — Petrovka, 38 as  senior lieutenant
2010 — Cherry Jam as geek
2010 — The Sky in Fire as Kostya Maretsky
2010 — Gift of Destiny as Stas
2011 —  To smithereens as Eric
2011 — Guys from Mars as Kolya
2011 —  The Life and Adventures of Mishka Yaponchik as Rzhevskij-Rajewski
2011 —  Celestial Family as Artyom
2011 —  Aliens Wings as Maretsky
2012 —  Cinderella as Alexey Korolevich
2012 —  Dragon Syndrome as Pan
2012 —  Latest Romans as Armen
2012 —  Southern Nights as Victor
2012 —  Barbara (was not completed)
2012 —  May Rain as Denis Pankratov
2013 —  Courier of the Paradise as Andrey
2013 —  Butterflies as Igor
 2013 —  Cesar as Alexey Govorkov
2013 —  Alien War as Edvard Kozlovsky
2013 —  Complex Usefulness as Maxim
2013 —  Kukushechka as guy in the bank
2014 —   Fotograf as Grisha
2014 —  Alyoshkа's Love as Roman 
2014 —  Fort Ross as Kondraty Ryleyev
2014 —   Friends From France  as Victor
2015 —  The Red Queen as Lev Barsky
2016 — Love as a Natural Disaster as Ruslan
2016 — Drunken Firm as Ruslan
2017 — Gogol. The Beginning as Alexey Danishevsky
2017 — Children For Sale as Kostya
2017 — Gogol. Viy  as Alexey Danishevsky
2017 — 2019[Ekspropriator] as Baron
2018 — Sparta as Igor   Kryukov
2018 — The Alchemist. Elixir Faust as Mark Terentyev, the illegitimate son of Oswald Rayner
2018 — Gogol. Terrible Revenge as Alexey Danishevsky
2018 — Player as Ilya Igorevich
2018 — The Crimean Bridge. Made with Love! as Viktor Felixovich Onegin, PR man
2019 — Gogol as Alexey Danishevsky
2019 — Abigail as William Garrett
2019 — Union of Salvation (film) as Amphelt, polkovnik
2020 — One Breath (film) as director of the sports institute
2022  — Raiders of the Lost Library as Max

References

External links

1982 births
Living people
Russian male film actors
Russian male stage actors
Russian male television actors
People from Kaliningrad
21st-century Russian male actors